Conistra ligula, the dark chestnut, is a moth of the family Noctuidae. The species was first described by Eugenius Johann Christoph Esper in 1791 and it is found in the Palearctic.

Distribution
It is found in western, central and southern Europe. In western Europe, it is missing in many parts of Scotland and the western part of Ireland. In central Europe it is missing on the German North Sea coast, in Denmark, the entirety of Fennoscandia wooded, the northern Baltic countries and the central and northern Russia. The species also does not occur on many islands of the Mediterranean. In North Africa, it is found in Morocco. Further east, its range extends into northern Iraq, Turkey and Armenia.

Description

The length of the forewings is 13–15 mm. "Forewing deep red brown or purplish brown, darker than vaccinii; a pale submarginal band, grey or brownish grey, on which stand the spots forming the submarginal line; the lines and edges of the stigmata, and often the veins pale; hindwing brownish fuscous." Differential characters: dark brown or red-brown base colour of the forewings. Pale subterminal fascia. brown fuscous hindwings.

Biology
It overwinters partially as an egg and partially as imago. Mainly females overwinter as imago.

Larva yellowish brown; the lines pale, but obscure; spiracular line pinkish ochreous, dark edged above; spiracles black. The larvae feed on Salix, Quercus, Prunus spinosa and Crataegus. Later instars feed on various herbaceous plants, such as Rumex and Taraxacum officinale.

Subspecies
Conistra ligula ligula
Conistra ligula gemella Rungs, 1972 (Morocco)

References

External links

 Taxonomy
Fauna Europaea
Lepiforum e.V.
De Vlinderstichting 

Cuculliinae
Moths of Europe
Moths described in 1791
Moths of Asia
Taxa named by Eugenius Johann Christoph Esper